The Meghalaya Legislative Assembly election was held on 27 February 2018 to elect 59 of 60 members to the Meghalaya Legislative Assembly, with the results declared on 3 March. The scheduled election in Williamnagar constituency was delayed to an undetermined date following the death of Nationalist Congress Party candidate Jonathone Sangma in an IED blast in East Garo Hills district on 18 February 2018. The incumbent Indian National Congress government, led by Chief Minister Mukul Sangma, attempted to win re-election for the third consecutive time.

Background

Electoral system 
The state of Meghalaya lies in the North-eastern region of India, predominantly populated by tribal groups. At the time of accession to the Independent India, these tribes were assured autonomy to make laws in and enforce local customs, management of land and forests. The sixth schedule of the Constitution of India provides for the establishment of autonomous District Councils to oversee these issues. As such, the powers of the state government are limited when compared with other states of India.

The Meghalaya Legislative Assembly is the legislative organ of the state. The legislature has 60 seats chosen through first-past-the-post method. The party or coalition with more than 30 seats can form the executive.

From 1976, no political party has secured an absolute majority in the state assembly, with Indian National Congress forming coalition governments.

Poll machinery 
The tenure of outgoing Legislative Assembly, elected in March 2013, was set to end on 6 March 2018. A total of 370 candidates contested the polls across the 60 constituencies. Out of these, only 32 were female candidates, despite the state's distinction of being a matrilineal society.

There were 17.68 lakh voters in the state, out of which 8.93 lakh voters were female. The number of first time voters in the state was 45%.

The election commission set up 3,082 polling booths in the state, out of which 60 booths will be pink booths - one in each constituency run completely by women. There were 172 polling stations in areas adjoining the 884-km-long Assam-Meghalaya border, with polling officials having to pass through Assam to reach several booths. The home department identified 633 polling stations as vulnerable, 315 as critical and 75 as both vulnerable and critical.

Counting will take place in 13 stations to be set up across the state.

Schedule 
The Election Commission scheduled the election for 27 February 2018 with the results to be announced on 3 March 2018.

Candidates
297 candidates registered to contest the election.

Issues

Coal mining in Jaintia Hills 
The Jaintia Hills in the eastern part of the state have rich deposits of coal. The National Green Tribunal banned rat-hole mining of coal in the state in 2014.  Tribal groups across Meghalaya maintain that according to the sixth schedule of the Indian Constitution, they alone have the right to the coal under the hills. But the Coal Mines (Nationalisation) Act, 1973, which vests ownership and control of the mineral with the Indian state, expressly lists Meghalaya’s coal mines as being under its purview. Besides, the Sixth Schedule also confers the right over underground minerals to the Indian state. It explicitly mentions the need for "licences or leases for the purpose of prospecting for, or extraction of, minerals". According to the Constitution, there is only one way a Sixth Schedule state can be exempted from the coal nationalisation law – by a presidential notification to that effect. Official records suggest that while the state government did express apprehension in the wake of the nationalisation of coal, it never applied for an exemption.

The state, in general turned a blind eye to the small-scale mining of coal, which had a huge impact on the ecology of the region, leading to the ban. However, numerous miners and workers were affected by the sudden decision and blame the incumbent Congress government for the failure. The Bharatiya Janata Party has promised to resolve the issue in eight months of coming to power, while the Congress government has assigned the mines to Meghalaya Mineral Development Corporation to operate the mines on behalf of the miners.

Exit polls

Results
The elections resulted in a hung assembly with no single party or alliance getting the requisite majority of 31 seats in the Vidhan Sabha. Conrad Sangma, leader of the NPP, announced that he would form a government with the support of the UDP, BJP and other regional parties. He was sworn in as the Chief Minister, along with eleven other ministers.

Elected members

The following is the list of the members elected in the Meghalaya assembly:

See also 
 Elections in India
 2018 elections in India

References

External links
Election Commission of India

Meghalaya
2018
2018
10th Meghalaya Legislative Assembly